Wong Tien Ci (born 10 January 1998) is a Malaysian badminton player who is affiliated with the Serdang Badminton Club in Selangor owned by former national player Ong Ewe Hock.

Career 
In 2022, Wong and his partner Boon Xin Yuan won back to back tournaments at the Uganda International and the Slovak Open. They later participated in the Malaysia Open. They were also semifinalists at the 2022 Taipei Open.

Wong also plays mixed doubles and pairs with Lim Chiew Sien. They competed in the Singapore Open and the Orléans Masters but lost in the first two rounds.

Achievements

BWF International Challenge/Series (2 titles) 
Men's doubles

  BWF International Challenge tournament
  BWF International Series tournament
  BWF Future Series tournament

References

External links 
 
 

1998 births
Living people
People from Johor
Malaysian sportspeople of Chinese descent
Malaysian male badminton players
21st-century Malaysian people